Miguel Ángel Aucca Cruz (born 10 August 1998) is a Peruvian footballer who plays as a defensive midfielder for Peruvian Primera División side Cusco FC.

Career

Club career
Aucca is a product of Real Garcilaso and got his official debut for the club in the Peruvian Primera División on 21 August 2016 against Juan Aurich. From his debut until 2019, he made 40 league appearances for the club. Real Garcilaso changed name to Cusco FC for the 2020 season.

On 7 December 2021, Aucca signed a contract extension with Cusco, until the end of 2022. He made a total six appearances in the 2021 season.

References

External links
 
 

Living people
1998 births
Association football midfielders
Peruvian footballers
Peruvian Primera División players
Real Garcilaso footballers
Cusco FC footballers
People from Cusco